Stingray Lite TV is a non-stop music television channel that brings mainly (soft) pop music videos from the 80s, 90s and today. 24/7. 2Connect Media BV launched the channel as Lite TV on 17 December 2007. In June 2014 the Stingray Group acquired Lite TV from the Archibald Media Group. On 1 April 2015, the channel has received its current name, before it was called Lite TV. Stingray Lite TV can be received via cable and IPTV in the Netherlands and Belgium.

References

External links 
 Official Website

L
Television channels in the Netherlands
Television channels in Flanders
Television channels in Belgium
Television channels and stations established in 2007